Walter Arnold (13 January 1876–1955) was an English footballer who played in the Football League for Chesterfield Town.

References

1876 births
1955 deaths
English footballers
Association football forwards
English Football League players
Chesterfield F.C. players
Denaby United F.C. players
Mexborough Town F.C. players